Tomorrow is a 2001 Italian drama film directed by Francesca Archibugi. It was screened in the Un Certain Regard section at the 2001 Cannes Film Festival.

Cast
 Marco Baliani - Paolo Zerenghi
 Ornella Muti - Stefania Zerenghi
 Valerio Mastandrea - Giovanni Moccia
 Ilaria Occhini - Mrs. Moccia
 Patrizia Piccinini - Betty
 James Purefoy - Andrew Spender
 David Bracci - Agostino Zerenghi
 Michèle Moretti - Tina Onofri (as Michela Moretti)
 Margherita Porena - Vale Toppetti
 Niccolò Senni - Filippo Zerenghi
 Silvio Vannucci - Sandro
 Stella Vordemann - Tina's Mother
 Anna Wilson-Jones - Claire
 Paolo Taviani - Minister

References

External links

2001 films
2000s Italian-language films
2001 drama films
Italian drama films
Films directed by Francesca Archibugi
2000s Italian films